Armstead is a surname, and may refer to:

 Arik Armstead (born 1993), American football player
 Armond Armstead (born 1990), American football player
 Henry Hugh Armstead (1828–1905), British sculptor
 Izora Armstead (1942 – 2004), American pop singer
 Jason Armstead (born 1979), American football player
 Jessie Armstead (born 1970), American football player 
 Jo Armstead (born 1944), American R&B singer and songwriter also known as Joshie Armstead
 Malcolm Armstead (born 1988), American basketball player
 Peter Armstead, English rugby league footballer who played in the 1950s
 Ray Armstead (born 1960), American sprinter
 Ryquell Armstead (born 1996), American football player
 Terron Armstead (born 1991), American football player

See also

 Armistead (disambiguation)

English-language surnames